Lazare Meerson (1900–1938) was a Russian-born cinema art director. After emigrating to France in the early 1920s, he worked on French films of the late silent cinema and the early 1930s, particularly those directed by René Clair and Jacques Feyder. He worked in England during the last two years of his life. He had great influence on film set design in France in the years before World War II.

Career

Early life
Lazare Meerson was born in Warsaw, which in 1900 was part of the Russian Empire. He may have begun studying painting and architecture in Russia, but after the revolution of 1917 he moved to Germany and by 1919 he had registered as an art student in Berlin. While in Berlin, he gained some experience of designing for the theatre, before leaving for Paris in 1923 or 1924.

In France
His first job in France in 1924 was at Films Albatros in Montreuil (a company which had been formed by Russian exiles in France) where he worked initially as a scene-painter and then as an assistant to some more experienced designers: Boris Bilinski (for L'Affiche), Alberto Cavalcanti (for Feu Mathias Pascal), and Pierre Kéfer (for Le Double Amour). By 1926, Meerson was appointed head of design at Albatros, and during the next three years he was responsible for the art direction on ten films. He formed particularly fruitful partnerships with  Jacques Feyder (on Gribiche, Carmen, and Les Nouveaux Messieurs) and with René Clair (on La Proie du vent, Un chapeau de paille d'Italie, and Les Deux Timides).

In several of his set designs of the 1920s, Meerson employed a 'restrained modernism', as in the spacious art-deco home of the wealthy Mme Maranet in Gribiche, or the architectural interior of a dancer's apartment, with its big white surfaces and sparse ornaments in Les Nouveaux Messieurs, or the sumptuous premises of the banker Saccard in L'Argent, in which the large open spaces facilitated long camera movements and the complex interplay of light and shadow. Meerson, in 1927, said of his work: "It is an art of self-denial. The designer should constantly conceal himself before the other elements of the production. The frame should never encroach upon the work itself. The setting harmonises with the film. Released from it is that atmosphere which is so important both to the director and to the performers."

With the end of the silent film era, Lazare Meerson moved with René Clair to Films Sonores Tobis at Épinay-sur-Seine, where he was appointed chef-décorateur (head of design). Together Clair and Meerson worked on four of the most influential early sound films of French cinema, starting with Sous les toits de Paris (1930). These films created an image of Paris which came to be seen by the world as quintessential, filled with picturesque urban neighbourhoods and easily recognisable 'types' of character, stylised in presentation and already anachronistic. Meerson's designs moved away from the monumental architectural sets which had characterised some 1920s productions, to favour a more intimate and painterly style which employed realistic detail and the play of lighting to create atmosphere. Marcel Carné praised the impact of these artificial film sets, when created by filmmakers of talent: "If it is true that we would swear we had met in the street, in the course of our daily life, the varied characters of Sous les toits de Paris or of 14 Juillet, it is no less true that we would also swear we had suddenly found ourselves, while happily wandering around the city suburbs one day, face to face with one of the popular streets invented by Meerson. The blind-alley of the street singers, the dark lane which runs beside the Petite Ceinture railway, the little square for the dance in 14 Juillet, even though we know they are entirely constructed, they move us with their unrestrained authenticity, even more perhaps than if Clair and his team had actually taken us to the real locations of the story."

When Jacques Feyder returned to France in 1933 after spending several years in Hollywood, he renewed his working relationship with Meerson on three sound films in France. Their partnership reached its peak with La Kermesse héroïque in 1935, for which Meerson created, in a suburban Paris studio, the 16th century Flemish town of Boom, with its streets, canals, public buildings and house interiors making reference to the paintings of Brueghel, Hals, and de Hoogh. Even in this historical context, he sought to combine realism with stylization: "Here Meerson put to the test all his experiments using iron, glass, and oil paint on a large scale, and he found ingenious ways to adapt parts of the studio factory to give his fantasies ballast. Here he achieved that balance between authenticity and the imaginary that was his goal and trademark and that would set the tone for the work of his many disciples".
In addition to his film work at this period, Meerson also undertook other design projects such as the refurbishment of the Paris home of Jacques Feyder and Françoise Rosay, and the creation of murals for the Casino in Monte Carlo.

In England
In 1936, Meerson moved to England, first at the invitation of Paul Czinner to work on a film of As You Like It, and then joining Alexander Korda at London Films for a further six films, commencing with Fire Over England. Most of these were made at Korda's newly built Denham Film Studios, whose huge resources initially impressed Meerson; subsequently however he began to have reservations about working for such a big studio with its Hollywood-style methods, and he missed the more intimate scale and personal relationships of his French productions. 
While he was working on the sets for The Citadel in 1938, Meerson contracted meningitis and died suddenly, shortly before his 38th birthday. Among those who attended his funeral were René Clair and Jacques Feyder.

Reputation and influence
Shortly after his death, the director Alberto Cavalcanti wrote a tribute to Meerson in which he highlighted  his personal qualities as a loyal and adaptable collaborator. He was described as "quiet, even taciturn; dependable, brilliant when brilliance was required, but having none of the instability which so often goes with brilliance."

Among the assistants or trainees who worked with Meerson on his French films during the 1930s were Alexandre Trauner, Jean d'Eaubonne and Georges Wakhévitch; they absorbed many of his ideas and their subsequent work in films saw the flowering of a style which has been given the label of poetic realism.

Meerson's influence upon the development of film set design was considerable. His personal style, marked by his Russian background and his experiences in Berlin, encouraged several trends in the cinema including that of poetic realism. His use of natural materials in the construction of sets, his carefully researched scenic recreations and his inventive use of false perspectives, always personally supervised at every stage of the work, established new standards in the art of film design.

Personal life
Meerson was married to the ballet dancer and model Mary Meerson, who was also from Russia. (After his death she became the partner of Henri Langlois, founder of the Cinémathèque française.)

Filmography
In the following films Meerson acted as set designer or art director.

References

External links

1900 births
1938 deaths
French art directors
French production designers
Soviet emigrants to France